is a town located in Fukushima Prefecture, Japan. , the town had an estimated population of 5702 in 2095 households, and a population density of 48 persons per km².

Geography
Yamatsuri is located in the southernmost portion of Fukushima prefecture, bordering on Ibaraki Prefecture to the south and Tochigi Prefecture to the west. .  Mt. Yamatsuri is in the center of the town, and the Kuji River flows from north to south. To the east of the town are the Abukuma Mountains.

Mountains: Yamatsuriyama (382.7m), Yamizosan (1021.8m) 
Rivers: Kuji River, Yamatsurigawa

Neighboring municipalities
 Fukushima Prefecture
 Tanagura
 Hanawa
Ibaraki Prefecture
 Daigo
 Hitachiōta

Climate
Yamatsuri has a humid climate (Köppen climate classification Cfa).

Demographics
Per Japanese census data, the population of Yamatsuri has been declining over the past 60 years.

History
The area of present-day Yamatsuri was part of ancient Mutsu Province. The area formed part of the holdings of Tanagura Domain, in the early Edo period, but mostly became tenryō territory under direct control of the Tokugawa Shogunate after 1729. After the Meiji Restoration, it was organized as part of Higashishirakawa District within the Nakadōri region of Iwaki Province.
The villages of Toyosato, Takagi and Ishii were created with the establishment of the modern municipalities system on April 1, 1889. On March 31, 1955 Toyosato and a portion of the village of Takagi merged to form the village of Yamatsuri. It was elevated to town status on January 1, 1963.

Economy
The economy of Yamamtsuri is primarily agricultural.

Education
Yamatsuri has one public elementary school and one public junior high school operated by the town government. The town does not have a high school.

Transportation

Railway
 JR East – Suigun Line
  -  -  -

Highway

International relations
 – City of Rockdale, New South Wales, Australia

References

External links

 

 
Towns in Fukushima Prefecture